Mitar Peković (born 28 September 1981) is a Serbian former professional footballer who played as a defender.

Club career
After making a name for himself at Zeta, Peković moved abroad and signed with Wisła Płock. He spent two and a half years in Poland, before returning to Serbia and joining newly promoted Serbian SuperLiga club Čukarički. He also played for Vojvodina, Anzhi Makhachkala, Budućnost Podgorica, Vendsyssel FF, Sloboda Užice, Bežanija, and Vrbas, before retiring from the game.

International career
At international level, Peković was capped five times for Serbia and Montenegro at under-21 level.

Notes

References

External links

 
 
 
 
 

Association football defenders
Danish 1st Division players
Ekstraklasa players
Expatriate men's footballers in Denmark
Expatriate footballers in Poland
Expatriate footballers in Russia
FC Anzhi Makhachkala players
First League of Serbia and Montenegro players
FK TSC Bačka Topola players
FK Bežanija players
FK Budućnost Podgorica players
FK Čukarički players
FK Kabel players
FK Sloboda Užice players
FK Vojvodina players
FK Zeta players
Montenegrin First League players
People from Bačka Topola
Russian Premier League players
Serbia and Montenegro expatriate footballers
Serbia and Montenegro footballers
Serbia and Montenegro under-21 international footballers
Serbian expatriate footballers
Serbian expatriate sportspeople in Denmark
Serbian expatriate sportspeople in Poland
Serbian expatriate sportspeople in Russia
Serbian First League players
Serbian footballers
Serbian people of Montenegrin descent
Serbian SuperLiga players
Vendsyssel FF players
Wisła Płock players
1981 births
Living people